The Reading Rockets were a professional indoor lacrosse team based in Reading, Pennsylvania, U.S. A charter member of the Professional Lacrosse League, they began play in the Fall of 2012. Home games were played at Sovereign Center.

External links
Reading Rockets official website

Sports in Reading, Pennsylvania
Lacrosse clubs established in 2012
Lacrosse teams in Pennsylvania
Lacrosse clubs disestablished in 2012
2012 establishments in Pennsylvania
2012 disestablishments in Pennsylvania